The University of Findlay (UF) is a private Christian university in Findlay, Ohio.  It was established in 1882 through a joint partnership between the Churches of God General Conference and the city of Findlay. UF has nearly 80 undergraduate programs of study leading to baccalaureate degrees and offers 11 master's degrees and five doctorate-level degree programs. Nearly 4,200 students from approximately 35 countries are enrolled at Findlay with an international student population of approximately 500. Approximately 1,250 students live on campus in university housing. The University of Findlay has a  main campus and five off-campus facilities.

History 

The predecessor of the University of Findlay, Findlay College, was founded on January 28, 1882, by the city of Findlay and the Churches of God General Conference. By 1897, the college had established an endowment of more than $100,000 and boasted sixteen faculty members. In 1989, Findlay College became known as the University of Findlay. The campus, still affiliated with the Church of God, embarked on a building campaign, adding five new buildings over the next several years. By the start of the twenty-first century, the institution boasted sixty-five different areas of undergraduate study and eight graduate programs. The university is especially well known for its equestrian studies program and offers equestrian riding as a varsity sport. In 2012, the university added structures to Davis Street to host its newly created pharmacy program.

Academics

The University of Findlay established the nation's first bachelor's degree in hazardous waste studies, now known as environmental, safety and occupational health management. The All Hazards Training Center, which grew from that initial program, has provided hands-on training simulations to more than 100,000 people from a wide range of backgrounds, including industry leaders and government officials involved in emergency planning, response and recovery.

Notable programs

The English equestrian program utilizes a  farm, named the James L. Child Jr. Equestrian Complex after the late university trustee, houses the English equestrian studies program. Established in 1992, the program has won an Intercollegiate Horse Show Association national title, several reserve championships and numerous individual honors. It also includes University Equine Veterinary Services Inc. and an adjacent, 30-acre nature preserve.

Founded in 1976, the western equestrian program shares a 152-acre farm, the Animal Sciences Center, with the animal science/pre-veterinary medicine program. The western program has earned five Intercollegiate Horse Show Association national championships in the past decade as well as numerous individual honors.

The Nuclear Medicine Institute is a one-year professional program that trains nuclear medicine technologists. It was established in 1966 in Cleveland and joined Findlay in 1984. It is accredited by the Joint Review Committee on Educational Programs in Nuclear Medicine.

Mazza Museum
The campus includes the Mazza Museum of International Art from Picture Books which contains the largest collection of children's book illustrations in the United States. It has the distinction of being the first teaching museum in the world, and one of the largest, specializing in original artwork from picture books. Its collection numbers more than 11,000 pieces from award-winning authors and artists. Its mission is to promote literacy through its educational programs and to collect, exhibit and preserve original art from children's books.

Outside the classroom
There are nearly 100 student organizations, including special interest clubs, student media, student government, performing arts groups, service clubs, academic honorary organizations, spiritual life groups, Greek sororities and fraternities, club sports, and 25 intramural sports. The school also holds a variety of theater productions, art exhibits, and vocal and instrumental music concerts.

Accreditation
UF is accredited by the Higher Learning Commission and the national accrediting organizations for athletic training, business, environmental health science and protection, intensive English language, nuclear medicine technology, nursing, occupational therapy, pharmacy, physical therapy, physician assistant, social work, strength and conditioning, and teacher education, teaching English to speakers of other languages.

Rankings
In 2021 University of Findlay was ranked No. 241 in National Universities by U.S. News & World Report.

Athletics

 
The University of Findlay, known athletically as the Oilers with their mascot named Derrick the Oiler, compete as a member of the Great Midwest Athletic Conference (GMAC) of the National Collegiate Athletic Association (NCAA)'s Division II. Its student-athletes participate in 23 intercollegiate sports: men's sports include baseball, basketball, cross country, Western equestrian, English equestrian, football, golf, soccer, swimming & diving, tennis, track & field, wrestling; while women's sports include basketball, cheerleading, cross country, dance team, Western equestrian, English equestrian, golf, lacrosse, soccer, softball, swimming and diving, tennis, track & field and volleyball. The newest varsity sports are western and English equestrian riding, which are mixed sports, although they have predominantly female participants. Both equestrian teams are members of the Intercollegiate Horse Show Association.

Notable alumni
 Tim Beckman, former head football coach at the University of Illinois at Urbana–Champaign
 Josh Bostic, 2009 NABC Division 2 Player of the Year, lead 2008-2009 Men's Basketball team to an undefeated (36-0) National Championship
 R. Clint Cole, U.S. Representative
 Ralph D. Cole, U.S. Representative
 Joanie Dodds, American fashion model
 Edward L. Feightner, World War II flying ace, test pilot, and Blue Angels pilot
 John W. Grabiel, Arkansas politician
 Tennyson Guyer, U.S. Representative
 Vic Joseph, ringside commentator for World Wrestling Entertainment
 Harold Jones-Quartey, Player for the Chicago Bears of the National Football League
 Waylon Lowe, NCAA D-2 Wrestling Champion; current professional mixed martial arts fighter
 Charlie Parker, basketball coach
 Stacy Westfall, professional horse trainer
 Bob Wortman, official for NFL and NCAA basketball; only official to work 2 Super Bowls and 2 NCAA Final Fours
John Gierach, American fly fishing writer

References

External links

 

 
Buildings and structures in Hancock County, Ohio
Education in Hancock County, Ohio
Educational institutions established in 1882
University of Findlay
Private universities and colleges in Ohio
1882 establishments in Ohio